Funk Overload is an album by Maceo Parker, released in 1998 via What Are Records? and Cream Records.

The album peaked at No. 43 on the Billboard Jazz Albums chart.

Critical reception
AllMusic wrote that "though Maceo's original lyrical attempts may be a bit immature, his years of experience and hard work shine through with every brassy attack and smooth soul note." The Washington Post thought that Parker's son, Corey, "emerges as an entertaining rapper." Billboard called the album "a hot, entertaining, straight-up R&B record that contains soulful originals and covers."

Track listing 
All tracks composed by Maceo Parker except where indicated
 "Uptown Up" (Maceo Parker, Corey Parker)
 "Sing a Simple Song" (Sylvester Stewart)
 "Maceo's Groove" (Maceo Parker, Corey Parker)
 "Elephant's Foot"
 "Let's Get It On" (Marvin Gaye, Ed Townsend)
 "Tell Me Something Good" (Stevie Wonder)
 "Youth of the World"
 "We're on the Move"
 "Inner City Blues" (Marvin Gaye, James Nyx Jr.)
 "Do You Love Me" (Maceo Parker, Michael Rucska)
 "Going in Circles" (Jerry Peters, Anita Poree)

Personnel 

Maceo Parker - alto saxophone, percussion, vocals
Ron Tooley - trumpet
Fred Wesley - trombone
Vincent Henry - tenor saxophone
Will Boulware - Hammond B3 organ
Bruno Speight, Steve Conte (track 6) - guitar
Jerry Preston - bass
Jamal Thomas - drums
Diann Sorrell, Kara Dio Guardi, "Sweet" Charles Sherrell, Jerry Preston - backing vocals
Corey Parker - rap (tracks 1,3,5)

References

External links 
 

1998 albums
Maceo Parker albums